State elections were held in South Australia on 7 December 1985. All 47 seats in the South Australian House of Assembly were up for election. The incumbent Australian Labor Party led by Premier of South Australia John Bannon increased its majority, and defeated the Liberal Party of Australia led by Leader of the Opposition John Olsen.

Background
Parliamentary elections for both houses of the Parliament of South Australia were held in South Australia on 7 December 1985, which saw John Bannon and the Australian Labor Party win a second successive term, against the Liberal Party of Australia opposition led by John Olsen.

Labor won the election with an increased majority–at the time, the biggest majority it had held since the end of the Playmander, a record that would stand until 2006. The Liberal Party retained John Olsen as leader, partly because his main rival Dean Brown lost his seat to Independent Liberal Stan Evans. Evans rejoined the Liberal Party soon after the election.

In the South Australian Legislative Council, Labor won one seat from the Liberals, while the Democrats maintained their 2 seats. This shift gave the Australian Democrats sole balance of power. They would continue to hold it until the 1997 election.

Key dates
 Issue of writ: 10 November 1985
 Close of nominations: 22 November 1985
 Polling day: 7 December 1985
 Return of writ: On or before 2 January 1986

Results

House of Assembly

 

|}

Legislative Council

|}

Seats changing hands

 In addition, Independent MP for Elizabeth, Martyn Evans retained his seat after winning it from Labor at the 1984 by-election.
 Sitting Liberal MP for Fisher, Stan Evans quit the party and contested Davenport as an Independent, and won.

Redistribution affected seats

 Sitting Labor MP for Newland, John Klunder instead contested Todd, and won.
 Sitting Liberal MP for Todd, Scott Ashenden instead contested Newland, and lost.

Post-election pendulum

See also
 Candidates of the South Australian state election, 1985
 Results of the South Australian state election, 1985 (House of Assembly)
 Results of the 1985 South Australian state election (Legislative Council)
 Members of the South Australian House of Assembly, 1985-1989
 Members of the South Australian Legislative Council, 1985-1989

References

History of South Australian elections 1857–2006, volume 1: ECSA
Historical lower house results
Historical upper house results
State and federal election results  in Australia since 1890

External links
South Australian Elections 1989: Parliament of Australia Research Library paper, including maps effective from 1983

Elections in South Australia
1985 elections in Australia
1980s in South Australia
December 1985 events in Australia